Godfrey Lionel Rampling (14 May 1909 – 20 June 2009) was an English athlete and army officer who competed for Great Britain in the 1932 Summer Olympics and in the 1936 Summer Olympics. He turned 100 on 14 May 2009 and was the oldest living British Olympian at the time of his death.

Life and career
Rampling was born in Blackheath, London, the son of Gertrude Anne (Taylor) and Horace Johnson Rampling, a costumier.

At the 1932 Summer Olympics, Rampling was fourth in his semifinal in the individual 400 metre event and didn't reach the final, but ran the anchor leg to help the British 4 × 400 m relay team win the silver medal, behind the United States.

At the 1936 Berlin Olympics, Rampling was again fourth in the semifinals of 400 metre competition and ran the second leg on the British 4 × 400 m relay team which won the gold medal.

Rampling was a Lieutenant Colonel in the Royal Artillery, attached to NATO, until retiring in 1958 after 29 years service.

He married Isabel Anne (née Gurteen; 1918–2001); their daughter Charlotte became a noted model and film actress. He was, as of October 2007, the last surviving male athletics medallist from the 1932 Summer Olympics and the last male gold medallist in athletics from the 1936 Summer Olympics.

Rampling was Britain's oldest living Olympic Gold medallist and also oldest living Olympic competitor. He celebrated his centenary with his family on 14 May 2009 at Bushey in Hertfordshire.

Rampling died in his sleep aged 100 on 20 June 2009.

References

External links
 
 
 Godfrey Rampling – Guardian obituary
 Article on Godfrey Rampling's forthcoming 100th birthday
 IAAF Obituary

1909 births
2009 deaths
Athletes (track and field) at the 1934 British Empire Games
Athletes (track and field) at the 1932 Summer Olympics
Athletes (track and field) at the 1936 Summer Olympics
Commonwealth Games gold medallists for England
Men centenarians
English centenarians
English male sprinters
Olympic athletes of Great Britain
English Olympic medallists
Olympic gold medallists for Great Britain
Olympic silver medallists for Great Britain
Athletes from London
People from Blackheath, London
Royal Artillery officers
Commonwealth Games medallists in athletics
Medalists at the 1936 Summer Olympics
Medalists at the 1932 Summer Olympics
Olympic gold medalists in athletics (track and field)
Olympic silver medalists in athletics (track and field)
British Army personnel of World War II
Medallists at the 1934 British Empire Games